Zöller or Zoeller is a surname. Notable people with the surname include:

 Fuzzy Zoeller (born 1951), U.S. golfer
 Greg Zoeller (born 1955), attorney general of the U.S. state of Indiana
 Günter Zöller (born 1948), German figure skater and figure skating coach
 Hugo Zöller  (1852–1933), German traveler and journalist
 Karlheinz Zoeller (1928–2005), German musician and solo flautist of the Berlin Philharmonic from 1960 to 1969 and from 1976 to 1993

See also
 Zoller